"Lionhearted" is a song recorded by American electronic music producer Porter Robinson. It was released on June 7, 2014 as the third single from his debut studio album Worlds (2014). Robinson wrote, produced, and performed the track. The song is different than the other songs on the record, less emotional and more pop-inspired. The song contains vocals from Swedish pop group Urban Cone.

An official music video for the single premiered on June 17, 2014, and involves Robinson and several Japanese women walking around a city, wreaking havoc by turning the city into glitchy, retro imagery. The song was well-received from critics, and was a hit on the American Dance/Electronic Songs chart.

Composition
Robinson has stated that he could have released the track during the months prior to the announcement of Worlds and its lead singles, as he felt that it was more of an anthem as opposed to the more emotional and touching tracks of Worlds. He has stated that the song is not one of his favorites, those being "Divinity", "Flicker", "Sad Machine", "Sea of Voices", and "Goodbye to a World". Robinson worked on vocal ideas for the song with American electronic music group The M Machine, but it didn't end up working out. Robinson did, however, keep some of the ideas from these sessions and developed them further with Urban Cone. The M Machine are credited as co-writers of the song.

The track includes many progressive house elements, including a sidechained lead backed by a 120 bpm kick drum pattern. The track also includes 808 percussion in its fills.

Charts

Weekly charts

Year-end charts

Release history

References

External links
 

2014 singles
2014 songs
Porter Robinson songs
Synth-pop songs
Song recordings produced by Porter Robinson
Songs written by Porter Robinson